Nita Sue Lowey ( Melnikoff; born July 5, 1937) is an American politician who formerly served as a U.S. Representative from New York from 1989 until 2021. She is a member of the Democratic Party. Lowey also served as co-Dean of the New York Congressional Delegation, along with former U.S. Representative Eliot Engel. Lowey's district was numbered as the 20th from 1989 to 1993, as the 18th from 1993 to 2013, and as the  beginning in 2013. The district includes many of New York City's inner northern suburbs, such as White Plains, Purchase, Tarrytown, Mount Kisco, and Armonk. She was succeeded by fellow Democrat Mondaire Jones.

In 2018, Lowey became the first woman to chair the House Appropriations Committee. She announced on October 10, 2019, that she would retire and not run for re-election to Congress in 2020.

Early life, education, and early political career
Lowey was born in the Bronx in New York City to Beatrice (Fleisher) and Jack Melnikoff. She graduated from the Bronx High School of Science and then Mount Holyoke College with a bachelor's degree in liberal studies.

Lowey worked for Mario Cuomo's 1974 campaign for lieutenant governor of New York. She then served as the assistant secretary of state of New York for 13 years.

U.S. House of Representatives

Elections

Lowey ran for the United States House of Representatives from New York's 20th congressional district in the 1988 election against incumbent Joe DioGuardi. She defeated DioGuardi. Her district was renumbered as the 18th district after the 1990 census and became the 17th after the 2010 census. For her entire tenure, Lowey represented a large slice of New York City's northern suburbs, including most of Westchester County and all of Rockland County. She used to represent some of the far northern portions of Queens and the Bronx until redistricting after the 2000 Census removed the New York City portion of her district.

Lowey considered running for the United States Senate in 2000, but stepped aside when First Lady of the United States Hillary Clinton announced her candidacy. Lowey was considered a top contender for appointment to Clinton's Senate seat after Clinton was nominated to be Secretary of State, but in a December 1, 2008, phone interview with the Associated Press, she stated that she was not interested in giving up her senior seat on the House Appropriations Committee.

In 2004, Lowey received 69% of the vote against political newcomer Richard A. Hoffman, a Wall Street investor and largely self-funded candidate who ran on a platform of opposing special interests and cutting federal taxes. Lowey emphasized her track record on homeland security issues, notably her work to reform the formula for distributing homeland security grants to states. In 2006, also against Hoffman, Lowey won with 70%. Lowey was re-elected to an eleventh term in 2008, with 68% of the vote against James C. Russell.

Tenure
Lowey received an "A" on the liberal Drum Major Institute's 2005 scorecard. She received 12% on the Club for Growth's 2007 congressional scorecard. According to the conservative Heritage Foundation, Lowey consistently votes in support of the policies of the Democratic Party, and is seen as a strong and effective progressive voice in that legislative body.

Her voting record on mass surveillance earned her a "D" on the Stand Against Spying Congressional Scorecard, which was created by a coalition of organizations and individuals from across the political spectrum advocating for transparency and an end to mass surveillance.

Early in her Congressional career, Lowey sponsored an earmark for the purpose of "dredging the Mamaroneck Harbor." According to the local newspaper, The Journal News, the dredging was proposed because "the harbor was becoming too shallow 'to accommodate the larger yachts.'"

In 2001–2002, Lowey served as the first female chair of the Democratic Congressional Campaign Committee.

One of the notable causes she supports is the Corporation for Public Broadcasting, in support of which she appeared at a congressional hearing accompanied  by Sesame Street characters Bert and Ernie.

Lowey has been a vocal advocate for a Security Council Resolution on the conflict in Darfur. She is responsible for the $500 million in the Emergency Spending Bill for Aid in Darfur.

Lowey voted for HR 2454, the "Cap and Trade" legislation.

In early 2009, Lowey introduced the Transportation Security Workforce Enhancement Act, which calls for collective bargaining rights for federal workers at the TSA and Department of Homeland Security. However, some statements from the TSA dispute the necessity of collective bargaining.

She was strongly critical of the Stupak-Pitts Amendment, which places limits on taxpayer-funded abortions in the context of the November 2009, Affordable Health Care for America Act. Because of the rancor and disruptions which marked many of the town hall meetings held in the summer of 2009 to discuss Health Care Reform, Lowey chose to present her point of view on Health Care Reform in a telephone conference call, the effectiveness of which was questioned by some of her constituents.

In 2018, the Democrats won the majority in the U.S House of Representatives and subsequently Congresswoman Lowey became the first Chairwoman of the House Committee on Appropriations. After she became chair, she negotiated a border security bill with Senator Richard Shelby that funded the government through 2020.

On October 10, 2019, two months after Democrat Mondaire Jones announced his intention to challenge her in a 2020 primary, Lowey announced she would not run for reelection in 2020.

For her tenure as the chairwoman of the House Appropriations Committee in the 116th Congress, Lowey earned an "A" grade from the non-partisan Lugar Center's Congressional Oversight Hearing Index.

Iran deal
Lowey announced her opposition to the nuclear deal with Iran, stating that
In my judgment, sufficient safeguards are not in place to address the risks associated with the agreement. Relieving UN sanctions on conventional arms and ballistic missiles and releasing billions of dollars to the Iranian regime could lead to a dangerous regional weapons race and enable Iran to bolster its funding of terrorists. The deal does not explicitly require Iran to fully disclose its previous military work to the IAEA's satisfaction before sanctions relief is provided, and inspectors will not have immediate access to the most suspicious facilities. There are no clear accountability measures regarding punishment for minor violations, which could encourage Iran to cheat.

2016 DNC superdelegate 
Like all Democratic members of Congress, Lowey was a superdelegate to the 2016, Democratic National Convention, pledged to support Hillary Clinton. Lowey's chief of staff, when asked by the New York Daily News whether Lowey might switch her support to candidate Bernie Sanders if Sanders were to win the New York State Democratic presidential primary, said "absolutely not... Hillary Clinton is Congresswoman Lowey's friend, colleague and her constituent, and she is behind her 100%."

Committee assignments (116th Congress)
 Committee on Appropriations (Chairwoman)
 Subcommittee on State, Foreign Operations, and Related Programs (Chairwoman)
 As Chairwoman of the full committee, Lowey may serve as an ex officio member of all subcommittees.

Caucus memberships
 Congressional Women's Caucus
 House Pro-Choice Caucus
 Hudson River Caucus
United States Congressional International Conservation Caucus
 Israel Allies Caucus
 Congressional Arts Caucus
 National Eating Disorders Awareness Caucus
 Congressional Crohn's and Colitis Caucus
 Afterschool Caucuses

Personal life
Lowey is married to Stephen Lowey, a named partner in the law firm of Lowey Dannenberg Cohen & Hart, P.C., which is located in White Plains, New York. According to the West Corporation, his practice areas include securities law, antitrust law, and consumer protection. They have three children and eight grandchildren. The estimate of Lowey's personal assets, based on financial disclosures members of Congress are required to provide (aside from that of personal residences and non-interest-bearing bank accounts), put her wealth at $41.2 million in 2010, based largely on her husband's investments. This figure is derived from a special investigative series of asset wealth of all U.S. Congressional Representatives conducted by The Washington Post.

Lowey is Jewish.

Electoral history

See also
List of Jewish members of the United States Congress
Women in the United States House of Representatives

References

External links
 
 

|-

|-

|-

|-

|-

1937 births
20th-century American politicians
20th-century American women politicians
21st-century American politicians
21st-century American women politicians
American Zionists
Democratic Party members of the United States House of Representatives from New York (state)
Female members of the United States House of Representatives
Jewish members of the United States House of Representatives
Jewish women politicians
Living people
Mount Holyoke College alumni
Politicians from Rockland County, New York
The Bronx High School of Science alumni
Politicians from Westchester County, New York
Women in New York (state) politics
21st-century American Jews